"(If There Was) Any Other Way" is a song by Canadian singer Celine Dion. It was included on her first English-language album, Unison (1990). "(If There Was) Any Other Way" was released by Columbia Records as the album's lead single in Canada on 26 March 1990. The next year, it was issued as the second single in other countries. The song was written by Paul Bliss, while production was handled by Christopher Neil.

After its release, "(If There Was) Any Other Way" received positive reviews from music critics. The song peaked at number 23 in Canada and number 35 on the US Billboard Hot 100. Additionally, it became a success on the adult contemporary charts, reaching number eight in the United States and number 12 in Canada. Two accompanying music videos for the song were filmed. Dion performed "(If There Was) Any Other Way" during her Unison Tour (1990–91).

Background and release
In 1990, Dion was preparing to issue her first English-language album, Unison. After releasing various French-language albums in Canada and France in the '80s, she recorded new English songs in London, Los Angeles and New York. At first, Unison was released in Canada, and "(If There Was) Any Other Way" was chosen as its lead single. Written by British musician, Paul Bliss, and produced by British record producer, Christopher Neil, it was issued on 26 March 1990.

One year later on 18 March 1991, "(If There Was) Any Other Way" was released as the second single in the United States after "Where Does My Heart Beat Now". For the US market the single was remixed by Walter Afanasieff. This US version features a different audio mix from the Canadian single version and the album version: reverb has been applied throughout (most noticeably to Dion's vocal track), the guitars have been rebalanced so that they are less audible in some places in the song and more prominent in others, the drum track features "rimshot" effects during the chorus, additional synthesizer lines have been overdubbed onto the existing keyboard track (most noticeably in the bar before the instrumental break), and the fadeout has been slightly extended in length. It was also used in the American music video of the song that year. Additionally "(If There Was) Any Other Way" was remixed by Daniel Abraham, a French record producer living in New York. His dance remixes appeared on a promotional US single.

"(If There Was) Any Other Way" was also released as a single in selected European countries, Australia, and Japan in June 1991.

Critical reception
AllMusic's senior editor Stephen Thomas Erlewine picked the song as an album standout along with "Where Does My Heart Beat Now". Larry Flick from Billboard noted that Dion "continues to soar" with a "spirited, up-tempo" song. He complimented the "crystalline production and shimmering backup vocal support combined with a passionate lead performance". Dave Sholin from the Gavin Report wrote about the song: "Nothing like witnessing the growth and development of a genuine artist. Celine definitely falls into that category, capturing the hearts of Americans the way she's been doing in her native Canada for the past several years. Switching from torch song to snappy rhythm affords listeners an opportunity to hear another side of this wonderful talent". Music & Media noted that "talented Canadian chanteuse enters the Whitney Houston racket" and described it as "satisfying AC pop." Christopher Smith from TalkAboutPopMusic described it as a "pop-soft rock mid tempo number".

Commercial performance
In Canada "(If There Was) Any Other Way" entered the RPM Top Singles chart on 31 March 1990 and peaked at number twenty-three on 9 June 1990. The song also entered the RPM Adult Contemporary chart on 24 March 1990 and reached number twelve there. In the United States "(If There Was) Any Other Way" debuted on the Billboard Hot 100 chart, dated 6 April 1991, and peaked at number thirty-five on 1 June 1991. The track also entered Billboards Adult Contemporary chart dated 30 March 1991, reaching number eight.

Music video
There were two music videos made for the song. The first one was directed by Derek Case and released in March 1990 for the Canadian market. The second one was filmed for the US market in Los Angeles, California, and Vancouver, British Columbia, Canada. It was directed by Dominic Orlando and premiered in March 1991. The two videos were included separately on Dion's 1991 home video Unison, depending on the Canadian or US release.

Live performances
Dion performed "(If There Was) Any Other Way" on a few Canadian television shows in 1990. She also sang it on the Canadian/US variety show, Super Dave and performed it in Norway in 1991. It was included in her Unison Tour as well.

Track listings and formatsAustralian 7", cassette, CD / Canadian 7" single"(If There Was) Any Other Way" – 3:59
"(If There Was) Any Other Way" (Instrumental) – 3:59Canadian cassette / European 3", 7" / Japanese 3" single"(If There Was) Any Other Way" – 3:59
"I'm Loving Every Moment With You" – 4:08European 12", CD single"(If There Was) Any Other Way" – 3:59
"I'm Loving Every Moment With You" – 4:08
"If We Could Start Over" – 4:23US 7" single"(If There Was) Any Other Way" – 3:59
"Where Does My Heart Beat Now" – 4:33US cassette single"(If There Was) Any Other Way" (Walter Afanasieff Remix) – 4:13
"Where Does My Heart Beat Now" – 4:33US promotional CD single'
"(If There Was) Any Other Way" (Daniel Abraham's 7" Remix) – 3:54
"(If There Was) Any Other Way" (Daniel Abraham's 12" Remix) – 5:39

Charts

Weekly charts

Year-end charts

Credits and personnel
Recording
Recorded at West Side Studios, London

Personnel
Celine Dion – lead and backing vocals
Christopher Neil – producer, backing vocals
Phil Palmer – guitars
Paul Bliss – songwriter, drums, keyboard programming, backing vocals
Simon Hurrell – engineer
Walter Afanasieff – additional producer, keyboards, percussion (Remix only)
Daniel Abraham – additional producer (Dance Remix only)

Release history

References

External links

1990 singles
1990 songs
Celine Dion songs
Columbia Records singles
Canadian dance-pop songs
Epic Records singles
Song recordings produced by Christopher Neil
Songs written by Paul Bliss